Beatrice Bernice Boateng is a Ghanaian politician and a member of the 5th parliament of the 4th republic of Ghana, as Member of Parliament for New Juaben South Constituency in the Eastern Region of Ghana.

Early life and education 
Boateng was born on 19 August 1951 in Koforidua in the Eastern Region of Ghana. She attended the University of Edinburgh, Scotland in 2001 and hold a Master of Science degree in education.

Career 
She is an educationist and has been the Regional Manager of the Presbyterian schools in the Greater Accra Region.

Politics 
She was first elected into parliament on the ticket of NPP during the December 2008 general elections as Member of Parliament for New Juaben South constituency. Beatrice obtained 34,409 votes representing 61.3% out of the 56,102 valid votes cast. She however lost her party's parliamentary primaries in 2012 and therefore could not represent the party in the 2012 election.

Personal life 
She is a widow with three children. She is a Christian and a member of the Presbyterian church.

References 

Women members of the Parliament of Ghana
New Patriotic Party politicians
Alumni of the University of Edinburgh
1951 births
Living people
People from Eastern Region (Ghana)